Kenji Ueno (上野 健爾, Ueno Kenji, 1945, Kumamoto Prefecture) is a Japanese mathematician, specializing in algebraic geometry.

He was in the 1970s at the University of Tokyo and was from 1987 to 2009 a professor at the University of Kyoto and is now the director of Yokkaichi University's Seki Kōwa Institute for Mathematics. In 1978 he was an Invited Speaker (Classification of algebraic manifolds) at the International Congress of Mathematicians in Helsinki.

Ueno was a visiting professor at several universities, including the University of Bonn and the University of Mannheim in the 1970s.

He is the author and editor of several books on algebraic geometry.

Selected publications
Algebraic Geometry, 3 volumes, American Mathematical Society 1999, 2002, 2003 (Vol. 1 From Algebraic Varieties to Schemes, Vol. 2 Sheaves and Cohomology, Vol. 3 Further Studies of Schemes)

with Koji Shiga, Shigeyuki Morita:  — Volume 2
with Yuji Shimizu: 

with Yukihiko Namikawa: 

with Joergen Andersen:

References

1945 births
Living people
20th-century Japanese mathematicians
21st-century Japanese mathematicians
Algebraic geometers
Academic staff of Kyoto University